The Moroccan National Olympic Committee (abbreviated as CNOM) is a non-profit organization serving as the National Olympic Committee of Morocco. It was formed in 1959 and recognized by the International Olympic Committee (IOC) in the same year.

Presidents

Executive committee
 President: Faïçal Laraïchi
 Vice Presidents: Kamal Lahlou, Fouzi Lekjaa, Abdeslam Ahizoune  
 Secretary General: Mamoun Belabes
 Treasurer: Omar Bilali
 Members: Jawad Belhadj, Tahar Boujouala, Mohammed Belmahi, Youssef Fathi et Abdelatif Idmahama

See also
Morocco at the Olympics

References

External links
 

Olympic
Morocco at the Olympics
Morocco at the Paralympics
1959 establishments in Morocco